Inquisitor elachystoma is a species of sea snail, a marine gastropod mollusk in the family Pseudomelatomidae, the turrids and allies.

Description
The length of the shell varies between 40 mm and 70 mm.

Distribution
This marine species occurs off Japan and in the East China Sea; also off the Philippines and East Africa.

References

  Martens, Eduard von, - Thiele, Johannes, Die beschalten Gasteropoden der deutschen Tiefsee-Expedition, 1898-1899; Jena : G. Fischer, 1904

External links
 
 Gastropods.com: Inquisitor elachystoma

elachystoma
Gastropods described in 1901